Frank J. Marshall is a private investor and a member of the Silicon Valley Advisory Council. He holds a B.S. in electrical engineering from Carnegie Mellon. Marshall has been written about or mentioned in various executive profiles, news stories, and IEEE papers.

References

21st-century American engineers
Living people
Year of birth missing (living people)